The Hanwoo, also Hanu or Korean Native, is a breed of small cattle native to Korea. It was formerly used as a draught animal, but this use has almost disappeared. It is now raised mainly for meat. It is one of four indigenous Korean breeds, the others being the Chikso, the Heugu and the Jeju Black.

History 

The Hanwoo was traditionally a working animal breed. Until the expansion of the South Korean economy in the 1960s, it was little used for beef production. A herd book was established in 1968. Hanwoo beef has since become a premium product. 

The Hanwoo was listed by the FAO as "not at risk" in 2007.

In 2001, the Hanwoo was suggested to be  a hybrid between taurine and indicine cattle. In 2014, single-nucleotide polymorphism analysis found Korean cattle to form a distinct group with the Yanbian breed of China, separate from European taurine breeds and distant from the indicine group.

Characteristics 

The Hanwoo is a small breed. The coat is brown; both sexes are horned. The cattle are fed rice straw as their principal source of roughage.
A rare white variant of the Hanwoo has been bred since 2009; in 2014 there were 14 head. It is reported to DAD-IS as a separate breed.

Use 

Despite its high price, Hanwoo beef is preferred in Korean cuisine, as it is typically fresher and of better quality than cheaper imported substitutes. Kim et al. (2001) noted, "Hanwoo is regarded as a premium beef because of its high palatability and desired chewiness". Since Koreans consider Hanwoo beef a cultural icon and one of the top-quality beefs of the world, it is used in traditional foods, popular holiday dishes, or as a special-day gift. 
Hoengseong County is best known for its Hanwoo cattle, where the environment is well-suited for cattle farming. The county began a strategic marketing campaign to brand itself as the origin of the highest quality beef in Korea; selling meat as a "premium product".

Gallery

References

Further reading
 Deepening about Hanwoo

Korean cuisine
Beef cattle breeds
Cattle breeds originating in Korea
Cattle breeds